FlyErbil is an Kurdish airline based at Erbil International Airport, Kurdistan Region. The airline was founded in 2015, but there was a three-year delay before its first launch due to the ISIL offensive in northern Iraq.

History

On 28 June 2018, FlyErbil commenced its first flight from Erbil International Airport to Rotterdam The Hague Airport via Kyiv International Airport (Zhuliany).

Destinations
As of March 2022, FlyErbil operates to the following destinations:

Fleet

References

External links
 

Airlines established in 2015
Iraqi brands
Airlines of Iraq
Iraqi companies established in 2015